Steve Goldstein or Steven Goldstein or variation, may refer to:

Steve Goldstein (diplomat), American government official 
Steve Goldstein (broadcaster), sports broadcaster 
Steven Goldstein (activist)
Steven Goldstein (racing driver), Colombian racing driver
Steven R. Goldstein, American physician and author

See also

All pages with titles Steven Goldstein
All pages with titles Steve Goldstein
 Goldstein (disambiguation)
 Steve (disambiguation)
 Steven